The Office of the Public Guardian may refer to:
Office of the Public Guardian (Scotland)
Office of the Public Guardian (England and Wales)